Tony Harrison (born 30 April 1937) is an English poet, translator and playwright. He was born in Beeston, Leeds and he received his education in Classics from Leeds Grammar School and Leeds University. He is one of Britain's foremost verse writers and many of his works have been performed at the Royal National Theatre. He is noted for controversial works such as the poem "V", as well as his versions of dramatic works: from ancient Greek such as the tragedies Oresteia and Lysistrata, from French Molière's The Misanthrope, from Middle English The Mysteries. He is also noted for his outspoken views, particularly those on the Iraq War. In 2015, he was honoured with the David Cohen Prize in recognition for his body of work. In 2016, he was awarded the Premio Feronia in Rome.

Works

Adaptation of the English Medieval Mystery Plays, based on the York and Wakefield cycles, The Mysteries, were first performed in 1985 by the Royal National Theatre. Interviewed by Melvyn Bragg for BBC television in 2012, Harrison said: "It was only when I did the Mystery Plays and got Northern actors doing verse, that I felt that I was reclaiming the energy of classical verse in the voices that it was created for."

One of his best-known works is the long poem "V" (1985), written during the miners' strike of 1984–85, and describing a trip to see his parents' grave in Holbeck Cemetery in Beeston, Leeds, 'now littered with beer cans and vandalised by obscene graffiti'. The title has several possible interpretations: victory, versus, verse, insulting V sign etc. Proposals to screen a filmed version of "V" by Channel 4 in October 1987 drew howls of outrage from the tabloid press, some broadsheet journalists, and MPs, apparently concerned about the effects its "torrents of obscene language" and "streams of four-letter filth" would have on the nation's youth. Indeed, an Early Day Motion entitled "Television Obscenity" was proposed on 27 October 1987 by a group of Conservative Members of Parliament (MPs), who condemned Channel 4 and the Independent Broadcasting Authority. The motion was opposed only by MP Norman Buchan, who suggested that fellow members had either failed to read or failed to understand the poem. The broadcast went ahead and, after widespread press coverage, the uproar subsided. Gerald Howarth MP said that Harrison was "Probably another bolshie poet wishing to impose his frustrations on the rest of us". When told of this, Harrison retorted that Howarth was "Probably another idiot MP wishing to impose his intellectual limitations on the rest of us".

Reception
Richard Eyre calls Harrison's 1990 play, The Trackers of Oxyrhynchus "among the five most imaginative pieces of drama in the 90s". Jocelyn Herbert, famous designer of the British theatrical scene, comments that Harrison is aware of the dramatic visual impact of his ideas: "The idea of satyrs jumping out of boxes in Trackers is wonderful for the stage. Some writers just write and have little idea what it will look like, but Tony always knows exactly what he wants."

Edith Hall has written that she is convinced that Harrison's 1998 film-poem Prometheus is "artistic reaction to the fall of the British working class" at the end of the twentieth century, and considers it as "the most important adaptation of classical myth for a radical political purpose for years" and Harrison's "most brilliant artwork, with the possible exception of his stage play The Trackers of Oxyrhynchus".

Professor Roger Griffin of the Department of History at Oxford Brookes University, in his paper The palingenetic political community: rethinking the legitimation of totalitarian regimes in inter-war Europe, describes Harrison's film-poem as "magnificent" and suggests that Harrison is trying to tell his audience
"To avoid falling prey to the collective mirage of a new order, to stay wide awake while others succumb to the lethe of the group mind, to resist the gaze of modern Gorgons".

Bibliography

Poetry 
 The Loiners (1970)
 From the School of Eloquence and Other Poems (1978)
 Continuous (50 Sonnets from the School of Eloquence and Other Poems) (1981)
 A Kumquat for John Keats (1981)
 V (1985)
  Dramatic Verse,1973–85 (1985)
 The Gaze of the Gorgon (1992)
 Black Daisies for the Bride (1993)
 The Shadow of Hiroshima and Other Film/Poems (1995)
 The Bright Lights of Sarajevo (1995)
 Laureate's Block and Other Occasional Poems (2000)
 Under the Clock (2005)
 Selected Poems (2006)
 Collected Poems (2007)
 Collected Film Poetry (2007)
 Kumkwat dla Johna Keatsa, in Polish, Bohdan Zadura (trans.), Warszawa: PIW (1990)
 Sztuka i zagłada, in Polish, Bohdan Zadura (trans.), Legnica: Biuro Literackie (1999)

Pamphlets 
 Earthworks (1964)
 Newcastle is Peru (1969)
 Bow Down (1977)
 Looking Up (1979)
 The Fire Gap  (1985)
 Anno Forty Two, Seven New Poems (1987)
 Ten Sonnets from "The School of Eloquence" (1987)
 A Cold Coming (1991)
 A Maybe Day in Kazakhstan (1994)

Film and television 

 The Blue Bird: lyrics for George Cukor film (1976)
 Arctic Paradise: verse commentary for film in series The World About Us, producer: Andree Molyneux for BBC Two (1981)
 The Oresteia: translation for National Theatre production with music by Harrison Birtwistle, filmed for Channel Four television. (October 1983)
 The Big H: musical drama, producer: Andree Molyneux, for BBC Two, (December 1984)
 The Mysteries:  adaption of medieval English mystery plays for the National Theatre, produced by Bill Bryden and Derek Bailey, filmed for Channel Four television. December 1985, January 1986)
 Loving Memory four poem-films, producer Peter Symes for BBC Two
 Letters in Rock: (July 1987)
 Mimmo Perrella Non è Piu: (July 1987)
 Muffled Bells: (July 1987)
 Cheating the Void: (August 1987)
 v.: poem filmed for television, producer Richard Eyre for Channel 4 (1987)
 The Blasphemers' Banquet: poem-film producer Peter Symes for BBC One (1989)
 The Gaze of the Gorgon: poem-film for television. (1992) which examines the politics of conflict in the 20th century using the Gorgon as a metaphor. The imaginary narration of the film is done through the mouth of Jewish poet Heinrich Heine. Located in Corfu the film describes the connection between the Corfu Gorgon at the Artemis Temple of Corfu and Kaiser Wilhelm II
 Prometheus: television film, also directed by the author (1998)

Theatre and opera 
 Aikin Mata (play), Nigeria (March 1964). An adaption of Aristophanes's Lysistrata. 
 The Misanthrope (play), National Theatre Company (opened at the Old Vic on 20 February 1973). Adaptation of Molière's Le Misanthrope.
 Phaedra Britannica (play), National Theatre Company (opened at the Old Vic on 3 September 1975). Adaptation of Racine's Phèdre 
 Bow Down (play with Harrison Birtwistle), National Theatre (4 July 1977).
 The Bartered Bride, translation into English of the opera by Bedrich Smetana, first seen at the Metropolitan Opera on 25 October 1978
Yan Tan Tethera (libretto for Harrison Birtwistle's opera), (1986).
 The Common Chorus (play), (1988). An adaption of Aristophanes's Lysistrata. 
 The Trackers of Oxyrhynchus (play), (1990). A hit play.
 Square Rounds (play), Olivier Stage (1992).
The Labourers of Herakles (play), (1995).
The Prince's Play, National Theatre, London, 1996. A translation and adaptation of Victor Hugo's Le Roi s'amuse. The play was subsequently published by Faber and Faber.
 Fram (play), Royal National Theatre (10 April 2008).

About Harrison and his poetry

Literary prizes 
 1972 Geoffrey Faber Memorial Prize (for The Loiners 1970)
 1983 European Poetry Translation Prize (Aeschylus's The Oresteia 1981)
 1982 Whitbread Prize for Poetry (The Gaze of the Gorgon 1992)
 2004 Northern Rock Foundation Writer's Award
 2007 Wilfred Owen Poetry Award
 2009 PEN/Pinter prize, inaugural award.
 2010 European Prize for Literature
 2014 European Poetry Prize
 2015 David Cohen Prize
2016 Premio Feronia

Reviews
 Craig, Cairns (1982), Giving Speech to the Silent, which includes a review of Continuous: 50 Sonnets from The School of Eloquence, in Hearn, Sheila G. (ed.), Cencrastus No. 10, Autumn 1982, pp. 43 & 44,

References

External links 
 

 Tony Harrison on Bloodaxe Books website
 
 Tony Harrison on the Faber and Faber website
 Guardian newspaper interview (March 2007)
 New Statesman profile (April 1999)
 Archival material at Leeds University Library

1937 births
Living people
Alumni of the University of Leeds
People educated at Leeds Grammar School
People from Gosforth
Writers from Tyne and Wear
Writers from Leeds
Fellows of the Royal Society of Literature
21st-century English writers
20th-century English dramatists and playwrights
21st-century English dramatists and playwrights
20th-century English poets
21st-century British poets
21st-century English male writers
English male dramatists and playwrights
English male poets
20th-century English male writers